All the Essentially Essential is a sculpture in Raffles Place Park, Singapore.

History
The sculpture was sculpted with stainless steel by Tan Wee Lit. The sculpture is of a toy kit, featuring several items, including a briefcase, a stroller and a bicycle, and is meant to represent the "work-life balance that Singaporeans strive for". The sculpture is intentionally left incomplete, to represent that "people's vitality and aspirations are the most essential factors that make life complete". The sculpture won the CDL Singapore Sculpture Award in 2007 and was temporarily displayed at the Singapore Art Museum. The sculpture was moved to Raffles Place Park in 2013.

Gallery

References

Buildings and structures in Singapore